In physics, the Majorana equation is a relativistic wave equation. It is named after the Italian physicist Ettore Majorana, who proposed it in 1937 as a means of describing fermions that are their own antiparticle. Particles corresponding to this equation are termed Majorana particles, although that term now has a more expansive meaning, referring to any (possibly non-relativistic) fermionic particle that is its own anti-particle (and is therefore electrically neutral).

There have been proposals that massive neutrinos are described by Majorana particles; there are various extensions to the Standard Model that enable this. The article on Majorana particles presents status for the experimental searches, including details about neutrinos. This article focuses primarily on the mathematical development of the theory, with attention to its discrete and continuous symmetries. The discrete symmetries are charge conjugation, parity transformation and time reversal; the continuous symmetry is Lorentz invariance.

Charge conjugation plays an outsize role, as it is the key symmetry that allows the Majorana particles to be described as electrically neutral. A particularly remarkable aspect is that electrical neutrality allows several global phases to be freely chosen, one each for the left and right chiral fields. This implies that, without explicit constraints on these phases, the Majorana fields are naturally CP violating. Another aspect of electric neutrality is that the left and right chiral fields can be given distinct masses. That is, electric charge is a Lorentz invariant, and also a constant of motion; whereas chirality is a Lorentz invariant, but is not a constant of motion for massive fields. Electrically neutral fields are thus less constrained than charged fields. Under charge conjugation, the two free global phases appear in the mass terms (as they are Lorentz invariant), and so the Majorana mass is described by a complex matrix, rather than a single number. In short, the discrete symmetries of the Majorana equation are considerably more complicated than those for the Dirac equation, where the electrical charge  symmetry constrains and removes these freedoms.

Definition
The Majorana equation can be written in several distinct forms: 
 As the Dirac equation written so that the Dirac operator is purely Hermitian, thus giving purely real solutions.
 As an operator that relates a four-component spinor to its charge conjugate.
 As a 2×2 differential equation acting on a complex two-component spinor, resembling the Weyl equation with a properly Lorentz covariant mass term.

These three forms are equivalent, and can be derived from one-another. Each offers slightly different insight into the nature of the equation. The first form emphasises that purely real solutions can be found. The second form clarifies the role of charge conjugation. The third form provides the most direct contact with the representation theory of the Lorentz group.

Purely real four-component form
The conventional starting point is to state that "the Dirac equation can be written in Hermitian form", when the gamma matrices are taken in the Majorana representation. The Dirac equation is then  written as

with  being purely real 4×4 symmetric matrices, and  being purely imaginary skew-symmetric; as required to ensure that the operator (that part inside the parentheses) is Hermitian. In this case, purely real 4‑spinor solutions to the equation can be found; these are the Majorana spinors.

Charge-conjugate four-component form
The Majorana equation is

with the derivative operator  written in Feynman slash notation to include the gamma matrices as well as a summation over the spinor components. The spinor  is the charge conjugate of  By construction, charge conjugates are necessarily given by

The matrix representation of  depends on the choice of the representation of the gamma matrices. By convention, the conjugate spinor is written as

A number of algebraic identities follow from the charge conjugation matrix  One states that in any representation of the gamma matrices, including the Dirac, Weyl, and Majorana representations, that  and so one may write

where  is the complex conjugate of  The charge conjugation matrix  also has the property that 

in all representations (Dirac, chiral, Majorana). From this, and a fair bit of algebra, one may obtain the equivalent equation:

A detailed discussion of the physical interpretation of matrix  as charge conjugation can be found in the article on charge conjugation. In short, it is involved in mapping particles to their antiparticles, which includes, among other things, the reversal of the electric charge. Although  is defined as "the charge conjugate" of  the charge conjugation operator has not one but two eigenvalues. This allows a second spinor, the ELKO spinor to be defined. This is discussed in greater detail below.

Complex two-component form

The Majorana operator,  is defined as

where 
 
It is

The Majorana equation for a left-handed complex-valued two-component spinor  is then

or, equivalently,

with  the complex conjugate of  The subscript  is used throughout this section to denote a left-handed chiral spinor; under a parity transformation, this can be taken to a right-handed spinor, and so one also has a right-handed form of the equation. This applies to the four-component equation as well; further details are presented below.

Key ideas
Some of the properties of the Majorana equation, its solution and its Lagrangian formulation are summarized here.

 The Majorana equation is similar to the Dirac equation, in the sense that it involves four-component spinors, gamma matrices, and mass terms, but includes the charge conjugate  of a spinor . In contrast, the Weyl equation is for two-component spinor without mass.
 Solutions to the Majorana equation can be interpreted as electrically neutral particles that are their own anti-particle.  By convention, the charge conjugation operator takes particles to their anti-particles, and so the Majorana spinor is conventionally defined as the solution where  That is, the Majorana spinor is "its own antiparticle". Insofar as charge conjugation takes an electrically charge particle to its anti-particle with opposite charge, one must conclude that the Majorana spinor is electrically neutral.
 The Majorana equation is Lorentz covariant, and a variety of Lorentz scalars can be constructed from its spinors. This allows several distinct Lagrangians to be constructed for Majorana fields.
 When the Lagrangian is expressed in terms of two-component left and right chiral spinors, it may contain three distinct mass terms: left and right Majorana mass terms, and a Dirac mass term. These manifest physically as two distinct masses; this is the key idea of the seesaw mechanism for describing low-mass neutrinos with a left-handed coupling to the Standard model, with the right-handed  component corresponding to a sterile neutrino at GUT scale masses.
 The discrete symmetries of C, P and T conjugation are intimately controlled by a freely chosen phase factor on the charge conjugation operator. This manifests itself as distinct complex phases on the mass terms. This allows both CP symmetric and CP violating Lagrangians to be written.
 The Majorana fields are CPT invariant, but the invariance is, in a sense "freer" than it is for charged particles. This is because charge is necessarily a Lorentz invariant property, and is thus constrained for charged fields. The neutral Majorana fields are not constrained in this way, and can mix.

Two-component Majorana equation
The Majorana equation can be written both in terms of a real four-component spinor, and as a complex two-component spinor. Both can be constructed from the Weyl equation, with the addition of a properly Lorentz-covariant mass term. This section provides an explicit construction and articulation.

Weyl equation

The Weyl equation describes the time evolution of a massless complex-valued two-component spinor. It is conventionally written as

Written out explicitly, it is

The Pauli four-vector is

that is, a vector whose components are the 2 × 2 identity matrix  for μ = 0 and the Pauli matrices for μ = 1, 2, 3.  Under the parity transformation  one obtains a dual equation

where . These are two distinct forms of the Weyl equation; their solutions are distinct as well. It can be shown that the solutions have left-handed and right-handed helicity, and thus chirality. It is conventional to label these two distinct forms explicitly, thus:

Lorentz invariance
The Weyl equation describes a massless particle; the Majorana equation adds a mass term. The mass must be introduced in a Lorentz invariant fashion. This is achieved by observing that the special linear group  is isomorphic to the symplectic group  Both of these groups are double covers of the Lorentz group  The Lorentz invariance of the derivative term (from the Weyl equation) is conventionally worded in terms of the action of the group  on spinors, whereas the Lorentz invariance of the mass term requires invocation of the defining relation for the symplectic group.

The double-covering of the Lorentz group is given by

This is used to relate the transformation properties of the differentials under a Lorentz transformation  to the transformation properties of the spinors.

The symplectic group  is defined as the set of all complex 2×2 matrices  that satisfy

where 

is a skew-symmetric matrix. It is used to define a symplectic bilinear form on  Writing a pair of arbitrary two-vectors  as

the symplectic product is

where  is the transpose of   This form is invariant under Lorentz transformations, in that 

The skew matrix takes the Pauli matrices to minus their transpose:

for  The skew matrix can be interpreted as the product of a parity transformation and a transposition acting on two-spinors. However, as will be emphasized in a later section, it can also be interpreted as one of the components of the charge conjugation operator, the other component being complex conjugation. Applying it to the Lorentz transformation yields

These two variants describe the covariance properties of the differentials acting on the left and right spinors, respectively.

Differentials

Under the Lorentz transformation  the differential term transforms as

provided that the right-handed field transforms as

Similarly, the left-handed differential transforms as

provided that the left-handed spinor transforms as

Mass term
The complex conjugate of the right handed spinor field transforms as

The defining relationship for  can be rewritten as   From this, one concludes that the skew-complex field transforms as

This is fully compatible with the covariance property of the differential. Taking  to be an arbitrary complex phase factor, the linear combination

transforms in a covariant fashion. Setting this to zero gives the complex two-component Majorana equation for the right-handed field. Similarly, the left-chiral Majorana equation (including an arbitrary phase factor ) is

The left and right chiral versions are related by a parity transformation. As shown below, these square to the Klein–Gordon operator only if  The skew complex conjugate  can be recognized as the charge conjugate form of  this is articulated in greater detail below. Thus, the Majorana equation can be read as an equation that connects a spinor to its charge-conjugate form.

Left and right Majorana operators 
Define a pair of operators, the Majorana operators,

where  is a short-hand reminder to take the complex conjugate. Under Lorentz transformations, these transform as

whereas the Weyl spinors transform as

just as above. Thus, the matched combinations of these are Lorentz covariant, and one may take

as a pair of complex 2-spinor Majorana equations.

The product is explicitly 

Verifying this requires keeping in mind that  and that  The RHS reduces to the Klein–Gordon operator provided that , that is,   These two Majorana operators are thus "square roots" of the Klein–Gordon operator.

Four-component Majorana equation
The real four-component version of the Majorana equation can be constructed from the complex two-component equation as follows. Given the complex field  satisfying  as above, define

Using the algebraic machinery given above, it is not hard to show that

Defining a conjugate operator

The four-component Majorana equation is then

Writing this out in detail, one has

Multiplying on the left by

brings the above into a matrix form wherein the gamma matrices in the chiral representation can be recognized. This is

That is,

Applying this to the 4-spinor

and recalling that  one finds that the spinor is an eigenstate of the mass term,

and so, for this particular spinor, the four-component Majorana equation reduces to the Dirac equation

The skew matrix can be identified with the charge conjugation operator (in the Weyl basis). Explicitly, this is

Given an arbitrary four-component spinor  its charge conjugate is

with  an ordinary 4×4 matrix, having a form explicitly given in the article on gamma matrices.  In conclusion, the 4-component Majorana equation can be written as

Charge conjugation and parity
The charge conjugation operator appears directly in the 4-component version of the Majorana equation. When the spinor field is a charge conjugate of itself, that is, when  then the Majorana equation reduces to the Dirac equation, and any solution can be interpreted as describing an electrically neutral field.  However, the charge conjugation operator has not one, but two distinct eigenstates, one of which is the ELKO spinor; it does not solve the Majorana equation, but rather, a sign-flipped version of it.

The charge conjugation operator  for a four-component spinor is defined as

A general discussion of the physical interpretation of this operator in terms of electrical charge is given in the article on charge conjugation. Additional discussions are provided by Bjorken & Drell or Itzykson & Zuber. In more abstract terms, it is the spinorial equivalent of complex conjugation of the  coupling of the electromagnetic field. This can be seen as follows. If one has a single, real scalar field, it cannot couple to electromagnetism; however, a pair of real scalar fields, arranged as a complex number, can. For scalar fields, charge conjugation is the same as complex conjugation. The discrete symmetries of the  gauge theory follows from the "trivial" observation that 

is an automorphism of  For spinorial fields, the situation is more confusing. Roughly speaking, however, one can say that the Majorana field is electrically neutral, and that taking an appropriate combination of two Majorana fields can be interpreted as a single electrically charged Dirac field. The charge conjugation operator given above corresponds to the automorphism of 

In the above,  is a 4×4 matrix, given in the article on the gamma matrices. Its explicit form is representation-dependent. It can be written as a real 8×8 matrix, presuming one also writes  as a purely real 8-component spinor. Letting  stand for complex conjugation, so that  one can then write, for four-component spinors,

It is not hard to show that  and that  It follows from the first identity that  has two eigenvalues, which may be written as

The eigenvectors are readily found in the Weyl basis. From the above, in this basis,  is explicitly

and thus

Both eigenvectors are clearly solutions to the Majorana equation. However, only the positive eigenvector is a solution to the Dirac equation:

The negative eigenvector "doesn't work", it has the incorrect sign on the Dirac mass term. It still solves the Klein–Gordon equation, however. The negative eigenvector is termed the ELKO spinor.

Parity
Under parity, the left-handed spinors transform to right-handed spinors. The two eigenvectors of the charge conjugation operator, again in the Weyl basis, are

As before, both solve the four-component Majorana equation, but only one also solves the Dirac equation. This can be shown by constructing the parity-dual four-component equation. This takes the form

where

Given the two-component spinor  define its conjugate as  It is not hard to show that  and that therefore, if  then also  and therefore that

or equivalently

This works, because  and so this reduces to the Dirac equation for 

To conclude, and reiterate, the Majorana equation is

It has four inequivalent, linearly independent solutions,  Of these, only two are also solutions to the Dirac equation: namely  and

Solutions

Spin eigenstates
One convenient starting point for writing the solutions is to work in the rest frame way of the spinors. Writing the quantum Hamiltonian with the conventional sign convention  leads to the Majorana equation taking the form

In the chiral (Weyl) basis, one has that

with  the Pauli vector. The sign convention here is consistent with the article gamma matrices. Plugging in the positive charge conjugation eigenstate  given above, one obtains an equation for the two-component spinor

and likewise

These two are in fact the same equation, which can be verified by noting that  yields the complex conjugate of the Pauli matrices: 

The plane wave solutions can be developed for the energy-momentum  and are most easily stated in the rest frame. The spin-up rest-frame solution is

while the spin-down solution is 

That these are being correctly interpreted can be seen by re-expressing them in the Dirac basis, as Dirac spinors. In this case, they take the form

and

These are the rest-frame spinors. They can be seen as a linear combination of both the positive and the negative-energy solutions to the Dirac equation.  These are the only two solutions; the Majorana equation has only two linearly independent solutions, unlike the Dirac equation, which has four. The doubling of the degrees of freedom of the Dirac equation can be ascribed to the Dirac spinors carrying charge.

Momentum eigenstates
In a general momentum frame, the Majorana spinor can be written as

Electric charge

To satisfy this restriction,  must be taken to be electrically neutral. This can be articulated in greater detail.

The Dirac equation can be written in a purely real form, when the gamma matrices are taken in the Majorana representation. The Dirac equation can then be written as

with  being purely real symmetric matrices, and  being purely imaginary skew-symmetric. In this case, purely real solutions to the equation can be found; these are the Majorana spinors. Under the action of Lorentz transformations, these transform under the (purely real) spin group  This stands in contrast to the Dirac spinors, which are only covariant under the action of the complexified spin group  The interpretation is that complexified spin group encodes the electromagnetic potential, the real spin group does not.

This can also be stated in a different way: the Dirac equation, and the Dirac spinors contain a sufficient amount of gauge freedom to naturally encode electromagnetic interactions. This can be seen by noting that the electromagnetic potential can very simply be added to the Dirac equation without requiring any additional modifications or extensions to either the equation or the spinor.  The location of this extra degree of freedom is pin-pointed by the charge conjugation operator, and the imposition of the Majorana constraint  removes this extra degree of freedom. Once removed, there cannot be any coupling to the electromagnetic potential, ergo, the Majorana spinor is necessarily electrically neutral. An electromagnetic coupling can only be obtained by adding back in a complex-number-valued phase factor, and coupling this phase factor to the electromagnetic potential.

The above can be further sharpened by examining the situation in  spatial dimensions. The implication is that  encodes the generalized Lorentz transformations (of course), while the circle can be identified with the  action of the gauge group on electric charges. That is, the gauge-group action of the complexified spin group on a Dirac spinor can be split into a purely-real Lorentzian part, and an electromagnetic part. This can be further elaborated on non-flat (non-Minkowski-flat) spin manifolds. In this case, the Dirac operator acts on the spinor bundle. Decomposed into distinct terms, it includes the usual covariant derivative  The  field can be seen to arise directly from the curvature of the complexified part of the spin bundle, in that the gauge transformations couple to the complexified part, and not the real-spinor part. That the  field corresponds to the electromagnetic potential can be seen by noting that (for example) the square of the Dirac operator is the Laplacian plus the scalar curvature  (of the underlying manifold that the spinor field sits on) plus the (electromagnetic) field strength  For the Majorana case, one has only the Lorentz transformations acting on the Majorana spinor; the complexification plays no role. A detailed treatment of these topics can be found in Jost while the  case is articulated in Bleeker. Unfortunately, neither text explicitly articulates the Majorana spinor in direct form.

Field quanta

The quanta of the Majorana equation allow for two classes of particles, a neutral particle and its neutral antiparticle. The frequently applied supplemental condition  corresponds to the Majorana spinor.

Majorana particle

Particles corresponding to Majorana spinors are known as Majorana particles, due to the above self-conjugacy constraint. All the fermions included in the Standard Model have been excluded as Majorana fermions (since they have non-zero electric charge they cannot be antiparticles of themselves) with the exception of the neutrino (which is neutral).

Theoretically, the neutrino is a possible exception to this pattern. If so, neutrinoless double-beta decay, as well as a range of lepton-number violating meson and charged lepton decays, are possible. A number of experiments probing whether the neutrino is a Majorana particle are currently underway.

Notes

References

Additional reading
 "Majorana Legacy in Contemporary Physics", Electronic Journal of Theoretical Physics (EJTP) Volume 3, Issue 10 (April 2006) Special issue for the Centenary of Ettore Majorana (1906-1938?). ISSN 1729-5254
 Frank Wilczek, (2009) "Majorana returns", Nature Physics Vol. 5 pages 614–618.

Quantum field theory
Spinors
Equations